Oersted is a lunar impact crater that has been flooded by lava, leaving only a crescent-shaped rim with a gap to the southwest. The rim climbs to a maximum height of 1.7 km. This feature lies to the southeast of the crater Atlas, and southwest of Chevallier. To the south-southwest is Cepheus.

The northern rim of Oersted is overlain by a broken, lava-flooded craterlet. Just to the south is a younger, still-intact crater named Oersted A that was formed after Oersted was flooded. To the northwest, the flooded crater Oersted P is attached to the northwest arm of the outer rim.

Satellite craters
By convention these features are identified on lunar maps by placing the letter on the side of the crater midpoint that is closest to Oersted.

References

 
 
 
 
 
 
 
 
 
 
 
 

Impact craters on the Moon